Kalafat is a quarter of the town Cide, Cide District, Kastamonu Province, Turkey. Its population is 146 (2021).

References

Populated places in Cide District